The 2018–19 Montana State Bobcats men's basketball team represented Montana State University during the 2018–19 NCAA Division I men's basketball season. The Bobcats, led by fifth-year head coach Brian Fish, played their home games at Brick Breeden Fieldhouse in Bozeman, Montana as members of the Big Sky Conference. They finished the season 15–17, 11–9 in Big Sky play to finish in a three-way tie for fourth place. They defeated Idaho in the first round of the Big Sky tournament before losing in the quarterfinals to Eastern Washington.

On March 17, head coach Brian Fish was fired. He finished at Montana State with a five-year record of 65–92.

Previous season 
The Bobcats finished the 2017–18 season finished the season 13–19, 6–12 in Big Sky play to finish in a tie for eighth place. They lost in the first round of the Big Sky tournament to North Dakota.

Offseason

Departures

Incoming transfers

2018 incoming recruits

2019 incoming recruits

Roster

Schedule and results 

|-
!colspan=9 style=|Exhibition

|-
!colspan=9 style=| Non-conference regular season

|-
!colspan=9 style=| Big Sky regular season

|-
!colspan=9 style=| Big Sky tournament

References 

Montana State Bobcats men's basketball seasons
Montana State
Bob
Bob